This is a list of people from Guinea, a country in West Africa.

Alfa Yaya of Labé
Ba Cissoko
Abdallah Bah
Almamy Schuman Bah
Mamadou Bah
Bobo Baldé
Habib Baldé
Sekouba Bambino
Ibrahima Bangoura
Ismaël Bangoura
Ousmane Bangoura
Sambégou Bangoura
Louis Lansana Beavogui
Bembeya Jazz National
Edouard Benjamin
Aboubacar M'Baye Camara
Alhussein Camara
Alsény Camara (footballer, born 1986)
Alsény Camara (footballer, born 1995)
Alsény Camara (footballer, born 1996)
Arafan Camara
Batouly Camara
Eugène Camara
Ibrahima Camara
Abdoul Kabèlè Camara
Kader Camara
Kémoko Camara
Mangué Camara
Manimou Camara
Mohammed Camara
Mohamed Camara (film director)
Ousmane N'Gom Camara
Papa Camara
Sekou Benna Camara
Titi Camara
Zeinab Camara
Mohamed Cisse
Alpha Condé
Mamady Condé
Lansana Conté
Sékou Kouréissy Condé
Sona Tata Condé
Daddi Cool
Ibrahima Sory Conte
Victor Correia
Alpha Yaya Diallo
Amadou Bailo Diallo 
Cellou Dalein Diallo
Ibrahima Diallo
Saifoulaye Diallo
Kaba Diawara
Sékou Oumar Drame
François Lonseny Fall
Pascal Feindouno
Simon Feindouno
Ibrahima Kassory Fofana
El Hadj Ismael Mohamed Gassim Gushein
Daouda Jabi
Samuel Johnson (footballer, born 1984)
Fatoumata Kaba
Mamadi Kaba
Oumar Kalabané
Mory Kanté
Solomana Kante
Kassa (mansa)
Abdoulaye Keita
Alhassane Keita
Mohamed Keita
Mamady Keïta
Naby Keïta
Mory Kanté
Lansana Kouyaté
N'Faly Kouyate
Camara Laye
Joseph Loua
Fodé Mansaré
Tierno Monénembo
Djibril Tamsir Niane
Souleymane Oularé
Williams Sassine
Odiah Sidibé
Lamine Sidimé
Aboubacar Somparé
Chérif Souleymane
Fodé Soumah
Issiaga Soumah
Abdoulaye Soumah
Morlaye Soumah
Abdoul Salam Sow
Suleyman (mansa)
Moussa Sy
Abdoul Karim Sylla (footballer, born 1981)
Abdoul Karim Sylla (footballer, born 1992)
Abdoulaye Kapi Sylla
Bengally Sylla
Kanfory Sylla
Kanfoury Sylla
Mamadou Sylla (politician)
Mohammed Sylla
Diallo Telli
Pablo Thiam
Ahmed Sékou Touré
Sidya Touré
Boubacar Traore (runner)
Diarra Traoré
Alseny Yansane
Amadou Bah Oury
Ibrahim Yattara
Souleymane Youla
Kamil Zayatte
Jalloh Serima 
Florentin Pogba
Mathias Pogba
Ibrahim Sorie Turay AKA Istoure
Diallo ElHadj Ourmar

See also
List of Guinean writers
Lists of people by nationality

References